This is the list of cathedrals in Ghana sorted by denomination.

Roman Catholic
Cathedrals of the Roman Catholic Church in Ghana:
 Holy Spirit Cathedral in Accra
 St. Francis de Sales Cathedral in Cape Coast
 St. Anne's Cathedral in Damongo
 Cathedral of St. Anthony of Padua in Goaso
 Sacred Heart Cathedral in Ho
 Christ the King Cathedral in Akatsi
 St. George's Cathedral in Koforidua
 St. Paul Cathedral in Mampong
 St. Peter's Cathedral Basilica in Kumasi
 Cathedral Basilica of Our Lady of Seven Sorrows in Navrongo
 St. Thomas Cathedral in Obuasi
 Our Lady Star of the Sea Cathedral in Takoradi
 Christ the King Cathedral in Sunyani
 Our Lady of Annunciation Cathedral in Tamale
 Cathedral of St. Paul in Techiman
 St. Andrew's Cathedral in Wa
 Cathedral of St. Joseph in Wiawso
 Cathedral of Our Lady of Lourdes in Yendi
 St. Michael Co-Cathedral in Keta
 St. Gabriel's Co-Cathedral in Konongo
 Sacred Heart Co-Cathedral in Bolgatanga
 St. Paul's Pro-Cathedral in Sekondi
 St. Francis Xavier's Cathedral in Donkorkrom
 St. Peter Claver's Cathedral in Jasikan

Anglican
Cathedrals of the Church of the Province of West Africa:
 Holy Trinity Cathedral in Accra
 The Cathedral Church of St Michael and All Angels in Asante Mampong
 Christ Church Cathedral in Cape Coast
 Cathedral Church of St. George the Martyr in Ho
 Saint Cyprian's Anglican Cathedral in Kumasi
 The Cathedral Church of Ascension in Sefwi-Wiawso
 Bishop Agliomby's Memorial Cathedral in Tamale
 St. Andrews Cathedral in Sekondi
 St. Anselm's Anglican Cathedral in Sunyani
 St. Peter's Anglican Cathedral in Koforidua
 The Cathedral Church of St Anthony of Padua in Diocese of Dunkwa-on-Offin

Methodist
Cathedrals of the Methodist Church of Ghana:
 Wesley Methodist Cathedral in Accra
 Wesley Methodist Cathedral in Cape Coast
 Wesley Methodist Cathedral in Kumasi
 Wesley Methodist Cathedral in Sekondi
 St. Paul's Methodist Cathedral in Tema

See also
 List of cathedrals

References

Cathedrals
Cathedrals
Ghana
Cathedrals